Paul Ray Powell (born March 19, 1948) is a retired American professional baseball player. Powell was the seventh player selected overall, and the first round pick of the Minnesota Twins, in the 1969 Major League Baseball draft. But he would appear in only in 39 MLB games over parts of three seasons as an outfielder and catcher for the Twins and Los Angeles Dodgers ( and ). Although modern sources list him only by his first name, during his baseball career he was referred to as "Paul Ray" Powell.

After graduating from Santa Cruz Valley Union High School in Eloy, Arizona, he attended Arizona State University, where he was the starting center fielder for ASU's 1969 championship team and a defensive back and placekicker on the Sun Devils' 1967 and 1968 football teams. He received his degree in secondary education in 1974.

Powell's pro career lasted for seven years, through 1975. As a major leaguer he collected seven hits, including a double and a home run, in 42 at bats (.167). His lone home run came in his third game in MLB on April 10, 1971, a solo blow off Don Eddy of the Chicago White Sox at Comiskey Park. Defensively, he played 80 innings in the outfield, and 24 as a catcher.

After leaving baseball, Powell had a long career in the real estate industry in Arizona.

References

External links

1948 births
Living people
Albuquerque Dukes players
All-American college baseball players
Arizona State Sun Devils baseball players
Arizona State Sun Devils football players
Baseball players from Arizona
Baseball players from Texas
Charlotte Hornets (baseball) players
Denver Bears players
Evansville Triplets players
Florida Instructional League Twins players
Los Angeles Dodgers players
Major League Baseball catchers
Major League Baseball center fielders
Minnesota Twins players
People from Eloy, Arizona
People from San Angelo, Texas
Portland Beavers players
Sportspeople from the Phoenix metropolitan area